Willie Davies (23 August 1916 – 26 September 2002) was a Welsh international dual-code rugby fly half who played rugby union for Swansea and rugby league for Bradford Northern. He won six caps for the Wales rugby union team and nine caps for the Wales rugby league team. In 2003 he was inducted into the Welsh Sports Hall of Fame. He was the cousin of Wales international Haydn Tanner.

Rugby career
Davies first played rugby for Wales Secondary Schools, alongside his cousin and future Welsh captain, Haydn Tanner. Davies progressed to play club rugby for Swansea and Hedingley, and in 1935 he played for Swansea against the touring New Zealand team. Alongside Tanner, Davies had an outstanding game in which Swansea were victorious over the supposedly 'unbeatable' All Blacks. Tanner and Davies were credited as orchestrating the Swansea success, even though still teenagers and attending Gowerton county school. The New Zealand captain, Jack Manchester, is said to have passed back the message to New Zealand; "Tell them we have been beaten, but don't tell them it was by a pair of schoolboys".

It was at Swansea he was first selected to represent Wales at rugby union. Davies was capped for Wales against Ireland under the captaincy of Joe Rees on 14 March 1936. When Wales won, thanks to a Vivian Jenkins penalty goal, he found himself as part of that year's winning Home Nations Championship team. Davies was back the next season, playing two games in the championship though after the highs of the previous season, Wales lost all their games to end up with the Wooden Spoon. Davies missed the entirety of the 1938 tournament, but was back for the 1939 championship, playing in all three games. In the last match against Ireland Davies scored all seven points with a try and a drop goal for Wales. His drop goal was the last four point drop goal ever scored in the Five Nations Championship, and the last for Wales until the end of World War II. During the war, Davies served as a member of the Royal Air Force.

In 1939 Davies left rugby union behind when he 'Went North' and joined professional rugby league team Bradford Northern. He was an outstanding player in a great Northern team.

Frank Whitcombe, Willie's Welsh teammate and fellow Lance Todd Trophy winner took on the role of 'minder' for Northern's slightly-built, mercurial stand-off when he was targeted by opposing teams.

He would later play rugby league for the Great Britain and Wales teams. In 1946 he went on tour with Great Britain against Australia and New Zealand. He played in the tour's  final Test in New Zealand and at point became a dual-code rugby international. When the Australians toured Britain the next year, Davies was chosen to represent the British team twice.

International matches played
Wales - rugby union
 1937, 1939
 1936, 1937, 1939
 1939

Challenge Cup Final appearances
Willie Davies played, and was man of the match winning the Lance Todd Trophy in Bradford Northern's 8–4 victory over Leeds in the 1946–47 Challenge Cup Final during the 1946-47 season at Wembley Stadium, London on Saturday 3 May 1947, played  in the 3–8 defeat by Wigan in the 1947–48 Challenge Cup Final during the 1947–48 season at Wembley Stadium, London on Saturday 1 May 1948, and played in the 12–0 victory over Halifax in the 1948–49 Challenge Cup Final during the 1948-49 season at Wembley Stadium, London on Saturday 7 May 1949.

Personal life
He qualified as a games and geography teacher at Carnegie College of Physical Education, Leeds and then taught at Bingley Grammar School. He spent most of his teaching career at Weston-super-Mare Boys' Grammar School.  He had a son and two daughters.

Bibliography

References

External links
!Great Britain Statistics at englandrl.co.uk (statistics currently missing due to not having appeared for both Great Britain, and England)
(archived by web.archive.org) The Millennium Masters - Backs
Photograph "Willie Davies - Wilie Davies, Northern's great Welsh stand off of the 1940s. - 01/01/1947" at rlhp.co.uk
Photograph "Northern at Fartown - The Northern side that took on Huddersfield in 1948. Bradford won 7-2 at Fartown. - 30/03/1948" at rlhp.co.uk
Photograph "1948 Challenge Cup Final - A world record crowd of 91,465 saw Bradford Northern lose to Wigan by 8 points to 3 in this 1948 Final at Wembley. Here King George VI is seen being introduced to the Bradford Northern side. - 01/05/1948" at rlhp.co.uk
(archived by web.archive.org) RAF Rugby Union team 16 January 1943

1916 births
2002 deaths
Bradford Bulls players
Dual-code rugby internationals
Great Britain national rugby league team players
Lance Todd Trophy winners
London Welsh RFC players
Royal Air Force personnel of World War II
Royal Air Force Physical Training instructors
Royal Air Force rugby union players
Rugby league five-eighths
Rugby league players from Swansea
Rugby League XIII players
Rugby union fly-halves
Rugby union players from Penclawdd
Swansea RFC players
Wales international rugby union players
Wales national rugby league team players
Welsh rugby league players
Welsh rugby union players
Welsh schoolteachers